Dennis John Shale, FCRP (19 February 1948 - 18 May 2017) was emeritus professor of respiratory medicine at Llandough Hospital in Cardiff, Wales. He was a fellow of the Royal College of Physicians and held the David Davies chair of respiratory and communicable diseases at the University of Wales College of Medicine.

References 

People from Leicester
20th-century English medical doctors
21st-century English medical doctors
Deaths from liver cancer
1948 births
2017 deaths